1922 was the 29th season of County Championship cricket in England. Yorkshire recovered the title and went on to win it four times in succession.

Honours 
County Championship – Yorkshire
Minor Counties Championship – Buckinghamshire
Wisden – Arthur Carr, Tich Freeman, Charlie Parker, C. A. G. Russell, Andy Sandham

County Championship

Leading batsmen 
Patsy Hendren topped the averages with 2072 runs @ 66.83

Leading bowlers 
Wilfred Rhodes topped the averages with 119 wickets @ 12.19

Notable matches 
Warwickshire and Hampshire took part in one of the most remarkable of all County Championship matches, at Edgbaston on 14–16 June. Warwickshire made 223 and then dismissed Hampshire for only 15, Calthorpe taking 4/4 and Howell 6/7. Eight batsmen made ducks. Following on, Hampshire did much better, but still seemed certain to lose at 274 for 8. George Brown with 172, and the captain's valet and wicket-keeper Walter Livsey with 110 not out, took the total to 521. Warwickshire needed 314 to win. Jack Newman and Alec Kennedy then bowled Hampshire to a remarkable victory.

References

Annual reviews
 Wisden Cricketers' Almanack 1923

External links
 CricketArchive – season summary

1922 in English cricket
English cricket seasons in the 20th century